The Puerto Rico Department of Economic Development and Commerce is the executive department of the government of Puerto Rico responsible for the economic development in the U.S. Commonwealth of Puerto Rico and all its commerce related matters.

History
The Department of Economic Development and Commerce was created by Pedro Rosselló in 1994 as an umbrella organization under which several economic development agencies would operate in a more coordinated fashion. Its first Secretary was Luis Fortuño, who appointed its former head, José Pérez Riera, after being elected Governor in 2008.

Agencies
Among the agencies under its jurisdiction is the Puerto Rico Industrial Development Company (PRIDCO), the Puerto Rico Tourism Company, the Puerto Rico Trade and Export Company and several smaller agencies dealing with cooperatives and horse-racing.

Secretary

 1994–1999: Luis Fortuño
 2005–2006: Jorge Silva Puras
 2007–2009: Bartolomé Gamundi
 2009–2013: José R. Pérez Riera
 2013–2016: Alberto Bacó Bagué
 2017–2020: Manuel A.J. Laboy
 2020–present: Manuel Cidre

External links
 ddec.pr.gov - Official site of the Department of Economic Development and Commerce

Executive departments of the government of Puerto Rico
Public debt of Puerto Rico